Francisco "Quico" Cortés Juncosa (born 29 March 1983) is a Spanish field hockey player who plays as a goalkeeper for Club Egara and the Spanish national team.

Club career
Cortés played his whole career for Club Egara, except for the 2012–13 season, when he played for Dutch side HC Den Bosch.

International career
Cortés was a member of the Men's National Team that won the silver medal at the 2008 Summer Olympics in Beijing, PR China. He also competed in the 2012 Summer Olympics. He was a part of the Spain squad which won the silver medal at the 2019 EuroHockey Championship. In December 2019, he was nominated for the FIH Goalkeeper of the Year Award.  On 25 May 2021, he was selected in the squad for the 2021 EuroHockey Championship.

References

External links
 
 
 
 

1983 births
Living people
Sportspeople from Terrassa
Spanish male field hockey players
Male field hockey goalkeepers
Olympic field hockey players of Spain
2006 Men's Hockey World Cup players
Field hockey players at the 2008 Summer Olympics
2010 Men's Hockey World Cup players
Field hockey players at the 2012 Summer Olympics
2014 Men's Hockey World Cup players
Field hockey players at the 2016 Summer Olympics
Field hockey players at the 2020 Summer Olympics
2018 Men's Hockey World Cup players
Medalists at the 2008 Summer Olympics
Olympic silver medalists for Spain
Olympic medalists in field hockey
Club Egara players
HC Den Bosch players
Expatriate field hockey players
Men's Hoofdklasse Hockey players
División de Honor de Hockey Hierba players
Spanish expatriate sportspeople in the Netherlands